Pachytriton, also known as the paddle-tail newts or Chinese newts,  is a genus of salamanders in the family Salamandridae. They are found in southeastern China.

Species
There are ten species:

References

 
Amphibian genera
Amphibians of Asia
Endemic fauna of China
Taxa named by George Albert Boulenger